Troglocimmerites is a genus of beetles in the family Carabidae, containing the following species:

 Troglocimmerites abashicus Belousov, 1998
 Troglocimmerites angulatus Belousov, 1998
 Troglocimmerites djanaschvilii Ljovuschkin, 1970
 Troglocimmerites imeretinus Dalzhanski & Ljovuschkin, 1985
 Troglocimmerites mingrelicus Belousov, 1998
 Troglocimmerites nakeralae Reitter, 1883
 Troglocimmerites oseticus Belousov, 1998
 Troglocimmerites pasquinii Vigna Taglianti, 1977
 Troglocimmerites pygmaeus Belousov, 1998
 Troglocimmerites suaneticus Reitter, 1877

References

Trechinae